The Muğlalı incident or the 33 Bullet Massacre is the event that resulted in the death of 32 Kurdish civilian and the escape of one of them, in July 1943, in the Özalp district of Van, where 33 people were allegedly executed for animal smuggling and on the orders of the 3rd Army Commander General Mustafa Muğlalı.

Incident 
During World War II, smuggling incidents increased, especially on the Iranian border. One of these incidents, which led to clashes between the tribes in the region and the security forces, broke out in the Özalp district of Van. Gendarmerie units sent to the border upon a tip that the Milan tribe, some of whom live on Iranian territory, abducted a large herd of animals in July 1943, could not catch the smugglers because they fled to Iran. Then, 40 relatives of the tribe living in Özalp were detained. Although the court arrested only 5 people and released the rest, 33 people were handed over to a military unit under the command of two second lieutenants for questioning, by order of Mustafa Muğlalı, who came to Özalp. The smugglers were shot near the border, and it was claimed that they were shot while trying to escape, based on a report prepared earlier. Even though a villager who survived the incident with injuries managed to announce the situation to the relevant authorities, no results could be obtained from the applications made.

With the Democrat Party becoming an effective opposition party, the incident that was tried to be covered up was brought up again. Upon the adoption of a parliamentary question submitted to the Presidency of the Grand National Assembly of Turkey, an investigation was launched against the military and civilian administrators regarding the incident. Muğlalı, who said that he gave the order for the shooting in the case where all the defendants were held in pre-trial detention at the General Staff Military Court, was sentenced to death on March 2, 1950, and then to 20 years in prison due to his advanced age and extenuating circumstances. But the military supreme court overturned the decision; Muğlalı died in prison on 11 December 1951 (at the age of 71) before the new trial started. Upon the CHP's claim that "discrimination was made against minorities" during the Istanbul pogrom, the incident was brought up again in the Parliament as a retaliation by the Democratic Party. This time, all the members of the Grand National Assembly of Turkey and the CHP at the time of the incident were allegedly responsible, and İsmet İnönü was tried for himself. The issue, which was discussed in the Assembly on February 12, 1956, and February 25, 1956, was closed again due to the statute of limitations and various amnesty laws, with the 1958 Parliamentary Investigation Commission report and Parliamentary deliberations.

Political discussions of the event 
Orhan Erkanlı, a member of the National Unity Committee, the junta that carried out the May 27 coup against the Democratic Party government, evaluates the incident as follows:

“The Democrats preferred to bring the great commander Muğlalı, who had achieved relative calm in the East for the first time after Kazım Karabekir, before the court, for the sake of their own political interests, instead of asking the sons of the Turkish army, who were martyred in the pursuit of bandits, to account for the endless strife (armed conflict). Of course, the governments of the period and İnönü were also aware of this practice. However, the valiant Muğlalı took the accusations of obeying the eternal rule of military service and commandership (the commander is responsible for everything done and not done) and he was sentenced to death as a result.“

In May 2004, the name of the gendarmerie border battalion in the Özalp district of Van was Mustafa Muğlalı Barracks. Later, in 2011, the barracks were named after Martyr Petty Officer Senior Sergeant Erkan Durukan.

General Mustafa Muğlalı also presided over the Independence Court, which was established after the Menemen incident and sentenced those who killed the second lieutenant Kubilay by beheading him to death.

After this incident, which is also known as the case of 33 bullets in history, Ahmed Arif published his poem "33 Bullets" in his poetry book named Longing for Shackles Eskittim.

References

Massacres in Turkey
Massacres in 1943
Extrajudicial killings in Turkey
July 1943 events
1943 crimes in Turkey
1943 murders in Turkey